Torgelow-Ferdinandshof is an Amt in the district of Vorpommern-Greifswald, in Mecklenburg-Vorpommern, Germany. The seat of the Amt is in Torgelow.

The Amt Torgelow-Ferdinandshof consists of the following municipalities:
 Altwigshagen
 Ferdinandshof
 Hammer an der Uecker
 Heinrichswalde
 Rothemühl
 Torgelow
 Wilhelmsburg

References

Ämter in Mecklenburg-Western Pomerania